Mona Hammond  (born Mavis Chin; 1 January 1931 – 4 July 2022) was a Jamaican-British actress and co-founder of the Talawa Theatre Company. Born in Tweedside, Jamaica, Hammond immigrated to the United Kingdom in 1959, where she lived for the rest of her life. Hammond had a long and distinguished stage career. She was best known for her work on British television and played Blossom Jackson in the BBC soap opera EastEnders.

Hammond was made an OBE in the 2005 Queen's Birthday Honours List for her services to drama. In 2018, she was awarded the Women of the World Lifetime Achievement Award for her long and distinguished theatre career and for championing Black British actors with the Talawa Theatre Company.

Early life 

Hammond was born Mavis Chin, on 23 January 1931, in Tweedside, Clarendon Parish. Her father was Chinese and her mother was Afro-Jamaican. She moved to the United Kingdom in 1959 on a Jamaican Scholarship and worked for Norman and Dawbarn Architects. She attended evening classes at the City Literary Institute in London for two years and was awarded a scholarship to the Royal Academy of Dramatic Art (RADA), graduating in 1964.

Career 

Hammond began her acting career as a voice actor when she appeared as Minette in the 1964 radio play adaptation of Roger Mais's novel, Brother Man. Soon thereafter she acted the role of Carole in Claude Whatham's television movie A Question of Hell (1964). She also made early appearances on television shows such as Softly, Softly (1968) and The Troubleshooters (1969). Her first leading role was as Lady Macbeth at the Roundhouse in 1970 in Peter Coe's African version of the play. She starred in many plays by an array of up-and-coming black writers: Sweet Talk by Michael Abbensetts, 11 Josephine House by Alfred Fagon and several plays written by Mustapha Matura, including As Time Goes By, Play Mas and Playboy of the West Indies. She also spent two years at the National Theatre in productions including Fuente Ovejuna and Peer Gynt directed by Declan Donnellan, and The Crucible.

In 1985, Hammond, along with Yvonne Brewster, Inigo Espejel and Carmen Munroe, founded Talawa Theatre Company, which became one of the UK's most prominent black theatre companies. It has produced award-winning plays about the African diaspora, and championed reinterpretations of classical British pieces. Hammond performed in several of its productions, including The Black Jacobins, The Importance of Being Earnest and King Lear.

Television work followed, which included roles in The Sweeney (1976); Wolcott (1980–81), a three-part ATV mini-series about a black detective based in East London; Black Silk (1985); Juliet Bravo (1985); Playboy of the West Indies (1985), Casualty (1986) and When Love Dies (1990). Hammond appeared in ITV's Coronation Street twice, first playing the role of Jan Sargent, and the second time playing Velma Armitage, mother of Shirley Armitage in 1988.

In 1994, she was cast as Blossom Jackson in the BBC soap opera EastEnders. She remained in the role until 1997. This was Hammond's second character in the soap, having previously played the minor part of Michelle Fowler's midwife in 1986. She was also an occasional actress in the BBC radio soap opera The Archers, playing Mabel Thompson, the mother of Alan Franks' (John Telfer) deceased wife.

Hammond played many roles in television sitcoms, including Susu in Desmond's (1990–94) and its spin-off Porkpie (1995–96); Us Girls (1992–93), in which she played Grandma Pinnock; Chef! (1996), and Grandma Sylvie Headly in The Crouches (2003–05).

In 1999, Hammond played the role of Nan in the children's TV series Pig-Heart Boy, based on a novel by Malorie Blackman. Hammond's other television credits included Making Out (1989); Trial & Retribution (1998) as Bibi Harrow: Sunburn (1999); Storm Damage (2000); The Bill (2001); Babyfather (2001); White Teeth (2002); A Touch of Frost (2003); Holby City (2001; 2005; 2011); Doctors (2006) and Death in Paradise (2011). She also appeared in the Doctor Who episode "Rise of the Cybermen" as Mickey Smith's blind grandmother Rita-Anne in 2006. Her film credits included Fords on Water (1983), Manderlay (2005) and Kinky Boots (2006). Hammond appeared in the 2008 movie 10,000 BC, directed by Roland Emmerich.

For a brief stint in October 2010, she reprised her role as Blossom Jackson in EastEnders: appearing in connection with screen great-grandson Billie Jackson's funeral, she returned with her on-screen grandson Alan Jackson.

Awards 

Hammond was appointed an Officer of the Order of the British Empire (OBE) in the 2005 Birthday Honours, for services to drama. In 2006, Hammond was presented with the Edric Connor Inspiration Award, the Screen Nation Film and Television Awards' highest UK honour. In 2018 she was awarded the Women of the World Lifetime Achievement Award for her long and distinguished theatre career and for championing Black British actors with the Talawa Theatre Company.

Personal life 

She was married to Michael Sanders from 1965 to 1971 when the couple were divorced. They had a son, Michael. She married again in 1973 to John Pedler, they divorced 1987. In her later years, Hammond moved to Brinsworth House, a retirement home for entertainers. In 2018, she welcomed Meghan, Duchess of Sussex, on a royal visit to the home.

Hammond died on 4 July 2022, at the age of 91. She is survived by her son, Michael and granddaughter Tallulah.

Partial filmography

Fords on Water (1983) – Winston's Mother
Pure (2002) – Woman Customer
The Life and Death of Peter Sellers (2004) – Ruth Attaway / Louise the Maid
Manderlay (2005) – Old Wilma
Doctor Who (2006) – Rita-Anne Smith
Imagine Me & You (2005) – Mrs Edwards
Kinky Boots (2005) – Pat
10,000 BC (2007) – Old Mother
Burlesque Fairytales (2009) – Death's Wife
Coriolanus (2011) – Jamaican Woman
 EastEnders (BBC soap opera) (1986, 1994–1997, 2010) – Midwife, Blossom Jackson

References

External links
 "Mona Hammond OBE", The British Blacklist.

1931 births
2022 deaths
20th-century British actresses
21st-century British actresses
Alumni of RADA
Black British actresses
British actresses of Chinese descent
British soap opera actresses
English people of Chinese descent
English people of Jamaican descent
Migrants from British Jamaica to the United Kingdom
Jamaican people of Chinese descent
Jamaican television actresses
Officers of the Order of the British Empire
People from Clarendon Parish, Jamaica
Place of death missing